Katherine Vargas is a Nicaraguan footballer who plays as a forward for CD Águilas de León and the Nicaragua women's national team.

Club career
Vargas has played for CD Águilas de León in Nicaragua.

International career
Vargas made her senior debut for Nicaragua on 8 April 2021 in a 2–0 friendly away win over El Salvador.

References 

Living people
Nicaraguan women's footballers
Women's association football forwards
Nicaragua women's international footballers
Year of birth missing (living people)